In law, a test is a commonly applied method of evaluation used to resolve matters of jurisprudence. In the context of a trial, a hearing, discovery, or other kinds of legal proceedings, the resolution of certain questions of fact or law may hinge on the application of one or more legal tests.

Tests are often formulated from the logical analysis of a judicial decision or a court order where it appears that a finder of fact or the court made a particular decision after contemplating a well-defined set of circumstances. It is assumed that evaluating any given set of circumstances under a legal test will lead to an unambiguous and repeatable result.

Kinds of legal tests 
 Bright-line rule
 Balancing test

International law
Berne three-step test
 Habitual residence test
Caroline test

Common law
"But-for" test

Canada
Andrews test
Air of reality test (see also R v Fontaine)
Assumed Jurisdiction test
Central management and control test
Collins Test
Community Standards of Tolerance test
Conway Test
Degradation or Dehumanization Test
Denial of Bail test
Gladue Test
Grant Test (see also R v Suberu)
Indecent conduct test (see also R v Kouri)
Integral to Distinctive Culture test
Interjurisdictional immunity
Internal Necessities Test or Artistic Defense
Meiorin test
Law test
Multiple Access test
Necessarily incidental doctrine
Oakes test
Overbreadth test
Patent unreasonableness test
Pith and substance test (see also R v Morgentaler)
Provincial Inability test
Purpose and form test
Real and Substantial Connection test
Reasonableness Standard
Sheppard Test
Smithers test
Sparrow test
Test for Aboriginal Title
Test for bias
Test for confusion
Test for detention
Test for exclusion of evidence
Test for the inclusion of hearsay evidence
Test for materiality
Test for material causation/contribution
Test for new principle of fundamental justice
Test for Infringement of Title
Test for inducement or contributory patent infringement
Tests for paramountcy – Express contradiction test & Frustrate the purpose test
Test for patent infringement
Test for peace, order, and good government (see also R v Crown Zellerbach Canada Ltd)
Void for Vagueness test
Waterfield Test
Wigmore Test

European Convention on Human Rights
Necessary in a democratic society

United Kingdom
Bolam test
Hicklin test
 Wednesbury unreasonableness test

United States
Aguilar-Spinelli test
Calculus of negligence test (Hand rule)
Consumer expectations test
Daubert standard
Frye test
Imminent lawless action
Lemon test
Miller test
Mt. Healthy test
Risk-utility test
SLAPS test (an element of the Miller test)
Reasonable expectation of privacy
Clear and present danger
Bad tendency
Shocks the conscience test
Wambaugh's inversion test. see: Obiter dictum. 
Sherbert test. see: Sherbert v. Verner
McDonnell Douglas burden-shifting framework

Notes and references

 
Common law